Pipedrive is a cloud-based software as a service company.  It is the developer of the web application and mobile app Pipedrive, a sales customer relationship management (CRM) tool. The company has more than 1,000 employees in its eight offices across Europe (Tallinn, Tartu, Lisbon, London, Prague, Dublin, Riga and Berlin) and two offices in the US (New York and Florida). Its CRM is used by over 100,000 customers around the world. In 2020, Pipedrive became the fifth Estonian-founded unicorn.

History 

Pipedrive was founded on June 21, 2010  by Timo Rein, Urmas Purde, Ragnar Sass, Martin Tajur, and Martin Henk. In 2011, Pipedrive joined AngelPad. It was the only European startup of the 15 teams the accelerator hosted. By 2019, Pipedrive raised a total of $91.2 million in venture funding from Atomico, Bessemer Venture Partners, Paua Ventures, Rembrandt Venture Partners and others. In 2019, Financial Times included Pipedrive in the FT 1000, a list of Europe's fastest-growing companies. On November 14, 2020, Pipedrive received a majority investment from investment firm Vista Equity Partners and reached the unicorn status.

Awards

See also
Comparison of CRM systems
Comparison of Mobile CRM systems

References

External links

Software companies of Estonia
Customer relationship management software companies
Software companies of the United States
Companies of Estonia
Software companies established in 2010
2010 establishments in Estonia